Ezmiralda Franja (born 4 February 1997) is an Albanian football defender currently playing for KF Vllaznia Shkodër.

See also
List of Albania women's international footballers

External links 
 

1997 births
Living people
Albanian women's footballers
Women's association football defenders
Albania women's international footballers
KFF Vllaznia Shkodër players